Cuceglio  (Cusele in Piedmontese language)  is a comune (municipality) in the Metropolitan City of Turin in the Italian region Piedmont, located about  northeast of Turin.

Monuments and places of interest 

In Piazza Guglielmo Marconi, the central square, there is the first Italian monument erected in honor of the king Umberto I of Italy and immediately behind an oak planted in honor of the queen.

The village is divided into two districts, the "Gui" and the "Riva" and a fraction, the "Cascine Cuffia". The latter are detached from the village and are at the bottom towards the plain, the "Gui" is the lower part of the real village and the "Riva" the highest part and includes the Sanctuary of the Beata Vergine Addolorata (Cuceglio), built between the 1747 and the 1758. From there is visible most of the flat land of "canavese", up to Turin.

Society

Demographic evolution

Ethnicities and foreign minorities 
As reported from the Istat there are 81 foreigners (38 males and 41 females) resident in Cuceglio, at 1 January 2011.

Economy 
For centuries in these morainic hills the main activity has been viticulture, then the cultivation of the vine up to the production of wine. Many wines are produced in Cuceglio, but certainly the most precious and characteristic is Erbaluce, from the name of homonymous vine. In Cuceglio there is the Cantina Sociale of the Canavese area and the Cantina Roletto.

Cuceglio borders the following municipalities: Scarmagno, Agliè, Vialfrè, Mercenasco, San Giorgio Canavese, and Montalenghe.

References

Cities and towns in Piedmont